The 2021 hurricane season may refer to:
2021 Atlantic hurricane season
2021 Pacific hurricane season
2021 Pacific typhoon season
2021 North Indian Ocean cyclone season
2021–22 South-West Indian Ocean cyclone season
2021–22 Australian region cyclone season
2021–22 South Pacific cyclone season
 Tropical cyclones in 2021